Carex phyllocephala is a species of flowering plant in the sedge genus Carex, family Cyperaceae. It is native to southern China, and introduced to Japan. A variegated cultivar, 'Sparkler', is commercially available.

References

phyllocephala
Endemic flora of China
Flora of Yunnan
Flora of Fujian
Plants described in 1955